Maurizio Stecca (born 9 March 1963) is a retired Italian boxer, who won the Bantamweight Gold medal at the 1984 Summer Olympics. He is the younger brother of former super bantamweight world champion of boxing, Loris Stecca.

Professional career
Stecca began his professional career in 1984 and compiled a career record of 49–4–0.  He won the WBO Featherweight Title in 1991 and successfully defended it three times.

Amateur accomplishments 
1979-1981 Italian Bantamweight Champion
1984 Olympic Bantamweight Gold Medalist

1984 Olympic Results
Below are the results of Maurizio Stecca, an Italian bantamweight boxer who competed at the 1984 Los Angeles Olympics:

Round of 32: Defeated Philip Sutcliffe (Ireland) on points
Round of 16: Defeated Star Zulu (Zambia) on points
Quarterfinal: Defeated Robinson Pitalua (Colombia) on points
Semifinal: Defeated Pedro Nolasco (Dominican Republic) on points
Final: Defeated Héctor López (Mexico) on points (won gold medal)

External links
 
 

|-

1963 births
Living people
Sportspeople from the Province of Rimini
Boxers at the 1984 Summer Olympics
Olympic boxers of Italy
Olympic gold medalists for Italy
Featherweight boxers
World featherweight boxing champions
World Boxing Organization champions
Olympic medalists in boxing
Italian male boxers
Medalists at the 1984 Summer Olympics
People from Santarcangelo di Romagna
20th-century Italian people